Cynoscion arenarius (sand seatrout, sand weakfish or, as it is also known, white trout) is a common species of drum fish found in the Gulf of Mexico and western Atlantic Ocean.  While not especially popular or targeted, it is still known as a sport fish and is often caught by anglers of these waters.  Research in biochemistry suggests that the sand seatrout may actually be a subspecies of the weakfish that lacks spots.  Often confused with the silver seatrout, the sand seatrout is larger and more often found inshore than its similar-appearing offshore cousin.  It also has a slight yellow hue, whereas the silver seatrout is more silver overall.  It averages at one pound and is reportedly a good fish for eating.

References 

Sciaenidae
Taxa named by Isaac Ginsburg
Fish described in 1930